Swartzia robiniifolia is a species of flowering plant in the family Fabaceae. It is found only in Colombia.

References

robiniifolia
Endangered plants
Endemic flora of Colombia
Taxonomy articles created by Polbot